The Great Stavropol Canal is an irrigation canal in Stavropol Krai in Russia. It starts at a dam at Ust-Dzheguta on the upper Kuban River and leads water northeast via the Kalaus River to the Chogray Reservoir on the Manych River.  It is 480 km long, and its maximum flow is 75 m³/s. Construction work started in 1957 and continued to 2006. In 1970s, the construction was under then First Secretary of the Stavropol kraikom, Mikhail Gorbachev's supervision.

See also 
Nevinnomyssk Canal

Canals in Russia
Buildings and structures in Stavropol Krai
Transport in Stavropol Krai